I Fight Dragons is an American chiptune-based rock band from Chicago. Their music is a combination of rock with chiptune, featuring electronic sounds made using Nintendo Game Boys and Nintendo Entertainment Systems, a genre also known as Nintendocore.  To date they have released four full-length albums: 2011's KABOOM!, which came out on Photo Finish / Atlantic Records, 2014's The Near Future, which they self-released after raising over $100,000 on Kickstarter through their "Project Atma" project, 2019's Canon Eyes, and 2021's Side Quests: B-Sides and Rarities. They have also released two EPs, 2009's Cool Is Just a Number and 2010's Welcome to the Breakdown. Their music has been featured on Nintendo Video as well as on the WWE, and they wrote and performed the theme song for ABC's The Goldbergs. They have toured the US with MC Chris and Whole Wheat Bread in 2009, 3OH!3, Cobra Starship, and Travie McCoy in 2010,  The Protomen in 2011, and they were on the entire 2012 and 2014 Vans Warped Tours. They went on their first national headlining tour, "The War of Cyborg Liberation Tour", with openers MC Lars and Skyfox in 2012. From 2010 until 2012 they were signed to Photo Finish / Atlantic Records, but in fall 2012 they won their release from the label. Since 2014, they have toured sporadically as well as playing annual headlining shows at Chicago's Lincoln Hall. Frontman Brian Mazzaferri attended Glenbrook South High School with Fall Out Boy lead vocalist and guitarist Patrick Stump.

History

Cool Is Just a Number (2009–2010) 
I Fight Dragons was formed in 2008, with all five members hailing from Chicago. Their first EP, Cool Is Just a Number, was self-released in 2009. In June, 2009, Mike Mentzer left the band to pursue his own solo career and was replaced by Packy Lundholm, who had played drums on the band's first EP, and has since played lead guitar in the band. On July 25, 2009, I Fight Dragons headlined the Metro in Chicago for the first time.  This show was captured as a Live DVD, and a limited run of 500 numbered and signed copies of the DVD, entitled "Dragon Fight!", were released in January 2010. In August 2009, Dave Midell left the band to pursue humanitarian causes.  Chad Van Dahm was brought in as the new drummer.

The band signed with manager J.J. Italiano and with booking agent Gabriel Apodaca of The Agency Group. in September 2009, signing their first major label contract.  I Fight Dragons went on their first National Tour with punk group Whole Wheat Bread and nerdcore rapper MC Chris in October of that same year. They played 45 US shows from 1 October to 24 November.

Welcome to the Breakdown (2010)
I Fight Dragons signed with Photo Finish / Atlantic Records in early 2010,  and went on to appear on the MTV "Too Fast For Love" tour, opening for 3OH!3, Cobra Starship, and Travie McCoy from April–June 2010. In his June, 2010, concert review, Rick Florino described the band as "one of the most unique, uplifting and unforgettable new acts on the scene." World Wrestling Entertainment announced that their song "Money" from their 2009 E.P. Cool Is Just a Number would be used as the theme song for the inaugural Money In The Bank Pay Per View, which helped to boost the band's popularity.

On November 27, 2010, I Fight Dragons released their second EP, Welcome to the Breakdown. They indicated that this EP consisted of songs  written for their Photo Finish / Atlantic Records debut album, but which ended up not having a place on the album and so were released as an EP instead.

KABOOM! (2011–2012) 
KABOOM! was released October 24, 2011. Its third single Save World Get Girl was released May 3, 2012 and was featured on Nintendo Video in late 2012.

Kickstarter album and The Near Future (2013–2014) 
On January 17, 2013 "cRaZie$" was released as the third and final single from KABOOM!. The band was in the studio recording new music for an EP to be released in 2013. The band also released an Internet-only album composed of demos from 2010 and 2011 that were in various stages of development, but for various reasons never made it on KABOOM! titled DEMOlition: Songs That Didn't Make It On KABOOM!. On June 21, 2013, "Move" was released as a single from DEMOlition and the music video features the four heroines of Phantom Breaker: Battle Grounds.  In April 2013, the band launched "Project Atma", a Kickstarter project to fund their new album, The Near Future.  On June 13, 2014, the band announced that the release date for The Near Future would be September 16, 2014, and released the track "No Strings". On August 28, 2014, the band announced that, due to manufacturing issues with the albums, the release date would be pushed further back. The Near Future was released publicly on December 9, 2014, and hit #5 on the Billboard Vinyl Album Charts the week of its release.  On December 20, I Fight Dragons played an album release show for The Near Future to a capacity crowd at Chicago's Lincoln Hall.

Patreon page, Canon Eyes and Side Quest: B-Sides And Rarities (2017–present)
On August 7, 2017, the band launched their Patreon page that would be used for raising funds for new albums, which they called Album Adventures. This also saw the return of band member Bill Prokopow. Digital copies of the finished album, titled Canon Eyes, were sent to all Patreons who contributed $15 or more on August 5, 2019. On September 16, 2019, the band released the first single from the album, titled "Punch Drunk Destiny". The album was released to the public on December 9, 2019 followed by a sold-out album release show at Chicago's Lincoln Hall.

On October 6, 2020, the band started raising funds for Album Adventure 2. As part of this Patreon campaign the band will release previously unreleased tracks exclusively for Patrons. On July 12th, the band announced via Twitter that an album titled Side Quest: B-Sides And Rarities will release on December 8, 2021.

Musical style
I Fight Dragons' musical style has generally been regarded as geek rock, chiptune, pop punk, pop rock, Nintendocore, electronic rock, alternative rock, electropop, and power pop.

Band members

Current members
 Brian Mazzaferri - lead vocals, rhythm guitar, NES (2008–present) 
 Bill Prokopow - keyboards, backing vocals, NES, NES Advantage, Power Pad, NES Zapper, Guitar Hero controller (2008–2014, 2017–present)
 Hari Rao - bass, NES (2008–present)
 Packy Lundholm - backing vocals, NES, SNES (2008–present), lead guitar (2009–present), drums (2008–2010)
 Chad Van Dahm - drums, NES (2009–present)

Former members
 Mike Mentzer - rhythm guitar, backing vocals, NES, SNES (2008–2009)
 Dave Midell - drums, NES (2009)
 Laura Green - backing vocals, NES, SNES, NES Advantage, Power Pad, Power Glove (2008–2010)

Timeline

Discography

Studio albums

Compilation albums

Extended plays

DVDs

Singles

Compilations and soundtracks
 2017 - The Goldbergs Mixtape
Features the track "Rewind" (The Goldbergs Main Theme)

Music videos

In popular culture
I Fight Dragons wrote the theme song, "Rewind", for the television show The Goldbergs.
Their song "No Kontrol" was featured in commercials for season 14 of Big Brother.
Their song "Money" was the official theme song for WWE's July 2010 Pay-Per-View Money in the Bank.
Their song "Heads Up, Hearts Down" was featured in the series finale of The Hills.
Their song "Disaster Hearts" was featured in a long-form commercial for NCIS.
Their song "Hero" was featured in the credits sequence for Magic: The Gathering – Duels of the Planeswalkers 2014.

References

External links
Official site
I Fight Dragons official Uvumi profile
Official fan site & street team

Musical groups established in 2008
Musical groups from Chicago
Nintendocore musical groups
Chiptune musical groups
Geek rock groups
American pop rock music groups
American pop punk groups
American electronic rock musical groups
American power pop groups